Scott Benjamin-Morton Effross (born December 28, 1993) is an American professional baseball pitcher for the New York Yankees of Major League Baseball (MLB). He played college baseball for Indiana University. He was selected in the 15th round of the 2015 MLB Draft by the Chicago Cubs, and made his MLB debut with them in 2021.

Early years
A native of Twinsburg, Ohio, Effross is Jewish. Growing up he was a member of Congregation Shir Shalom, and he wears a Star of David necklace while pitching. 

Effross played baseball for Twinsburg High School ('12). In his senior year, as a pitcher he had an 8–1 win–loss record with a 1.52 earned run average (ERA), and struck out 60 batters while allowing 14 walks in 55 innings pitched. He was also the team's first baseman, and in his senior year batted .380. He was First Team All-Northeast Ohio Conference in 2011 and 2012, named to the Plain Dealer High School Baseball All-Star team, the Northeast Ohio Baseball Coaches Association All Star Team, and the All-Ohio Academic Team in 2012, and was Mizuno All-Ohio in 2012.

College career
Effross enrolled at Indiana University and played college baseball for the Indiana Hoosiers, while majoring in political science. In his freshman season in 2013 he was 6–1 with a 2.44 ERA and threw  innings in 28 games, the fourth-most pitching appearances in a season in school history. His five saves tied for 10th in school history. He was a Louisville Slugger Freshman All-American, Second Team All-Big Ten Conference, and a member of the Big Ten All-Freshman team.  

In his sophomore year, in 2014, Effross was 5–3 with a 1.98 ERA (the 10th-best mark in school history, minimum 50 innings), was first in the Big Ten with a school record 32 appearances, tied for first with 31 games in relief, tied for fourth with 19 games finished, and was eighth with five saves.  He also played collegiate summer baseball for the Wareham Gatemen of the Cape Cod Baseball League, and was named a league all-star. 

In 2015, as a junior, Effross was 4–4 with two saves and a 2.35 ERA (sixth in the Big Ten) in 21 games (seven starts). Effross pitched  innings, had an 0.962 WHIP (fifth), gave up 1.3 walks per nine innings (seventh), and kept opposing batters to a .217 batting average against (7th). The Jewish Sports Review named Effross to their 2015 Division I College Baseball All-America team. He finished his college career with 81 pitching appearances (fourth all-time at Indiana University), tied for fifth with 12 saves, and was seventh with a 2.27 ERA.

Professional career

Minor leagues
The Chicago Cubs selected Effross in the 15th round of the 2015 MLB draft, and he signed for a signing bonus of $100,000. In 2015, Effross pitched for the AZL Cubs of the Rookie Arizona League, and the Eugene Emeralds of the Class A- Northwest League. Between the two teams, he was 0–1 with two saves and a 2.14 ERA in 12 relief appearances covering 21 innings. In 2016 he played for the South Bend Cubs of the Class A Midwest League, and the Myrtle Beach Pelicans of the Class A+ Carolina League. Between the two teams he was 7–0 with two saves and a 3.23 ERA in 41 games covering 64 innings.

In 2017, Effross again pitched for Myrtle Beach. Effross was 5–2 with nine saves (4th in the Carolina League) and a 3.40 ERA in 42 games (3rd), including 2 starts, covering 79.1 innings in which he gave up only one home run. In 2018, Effross pitched for the Tennessee Smokies of the Class AA Southern League. He was 2–6 with one save and a 5.97 ERA in 44 relief appearances (4th in the league) covering 63.1 innings. 

In 2019 he played for the AZL Cubs 2 of the Arizona League, the Pelicans, and the Smokies and was 2–2 with a 4.33 ERA in 28 games (one start) covering 52 innings, and gave up only 1.7 walks per 9 innings. In mid-2019, the Cubs approached Effross about changing his pitching motion to a full sidearm motion, from what had been a low three-quarters angle, and he credits rehab pitching coordinator Josh Zeid with helping him through the mid-season change. In the fall of 2019 he then pitched for the Mesa Solar Sox of the Arizona Fall League, and was 1–0 with a 1.80 ERA in eight relief appearances covering 10 innings.

In 2021, Effross split the season between the Smokies, now in the Double-A South, and the Iowa Cubs of the Triple-A East. Effross was 7–2 with two saves and a 3.41 ERA in 31 games (2 starts) covering 60.2 innings in which he gave up 44 hits and 15 walks while striking out 66 batters (9.8 strikeouts per 9 innings), with an 0.973 WHIP.

Chicago Cubs
Effross was called up to the majors for the first time on August 28, 2021. He made his MLB debut on August 29, tossing  innings against the Chicago White Sox. In 2021 for the Cubs, Effross was 2–1 with a 3.68 ERA. He made 14 relief appearances covering  innings, in which he gave up one walk and had 18 strikeouts, and had an 0.955 WHIP.

In 2022 for the Cubs, before he was traded mid-season Effross was 1–4 with 13 holds, one save, and a 2.66 ERA, as in 47 games (2nd in the NL at the time of his trade) with one start he pitched 44 innings, with 11 walks and 50 strikeouts.  He stranded 24 of 28 inherited runners (85.7%), the third-best rate in the NL.  He had a WHIP of 1.068, gave up 7.4 hits per 9 innings, 2.3 walks per 9 innings, and had 10.2 strikeouts per 9 innings, while holding batters to a slash line of .220/.267/.299 (.167/.231/.292 with 2 outs and runners in scoring position). He was at the time in the top 5% of major league pitchers in keeping batters to a low barrel percentage, and inducing a high chase rate. He had the seventh-lowest average release point of major league pitchers, at 3.67 feet above the ground, as compared to the average of 5.82 feet.

New York Yankees
On August 1, 2022, the Cubs traded Effross to the New York Yankees for pitcher Hayden Wesneski. With the Yankees in 2022 he was 0–0 with 3 saves, 3 holds, and a 2.14 ERA in 13 relief appearances in which he pitched 12.2 innings, with a 1.026 WHIP, in high-leverage situations. 

In 2022, with the Cubs and the Yankees combined, Effross was 1–4 with four saves and 16 holds. He had a 2.54 ERA, as in 60 relief appearances he pitched 56.2 innings, had 62 strikeouts, and a WHIP of 1.059. Among major league relievers with 50 or more innings pitched, he allowed the lowest percentage of hard-hit balls (19.0%) and pulled balls (28.9%), had the highest called-strike percentage (20.7%), and allowed the 2nd-lowest barrel percentage (3.5%). He threw mostly an  sweeping slider (against which batters hit .149) and  biting sinker, with a less frequent  changeup and  heavy sinking 4-seam fastball.

On October 11, 2022, it was reported that Effross would need Tommy John surgery to repair a torn UCL ligament in his right elbow. He therefore missed the 2022 playoffs. He will also likely miss the entire 2023 season, inasmuch as rehabilitation and recovery from Tommy John surgery generally takes at least 12 months, and often longer.

See also
List of Jewish baseball players

References

External links

1993 births
Living people
People from Twinsburg, Ohio
Baseball players from Ohio
Jewish American baseball players
Jewish Major League Baseball players
Major League Baseball pitchers
Chicago Cubs players
New York Yankees players
Indiana Hoosiers baseball players
Wareham Gatemen players
Arizona League Cubs players
Eugene Emeralds players
South Bend Cubs players
Myrtle Beach Pelicans players
Tennessee Smokies players
Mesa Solar Sox players
Iowa Cubs players